Barbara Rubin (1945–1980) was an American filmmaker and performance artist. She is best known for her landmark 1963 underground film Christmas on Earth.

Life and career
Barbara Rubin grew up in the Cambria Heights neighborhood of Queens, New York City. In the spring of 1963, she was hired by Jonas Mekas to work for the Film-Makers' Cooperative, a non-profit organization co-founded by several artists to distribute avant-garde films. The cooperative was frequented by many notable artists, including Robert Frank, Allen Ginsberg, Salvador Dalí, Ron Rice, Jerry Jofen, Jack Smith, and Andy Warhol. Rubin soon became indispensable to Mekas, organizing local and international events. "Her contributions are so many and different," Mekas said in 2003. "....Her life story still has to be written because she was very, I think, important."

Christmas on Earth
Originally titled Cocks and Cunts, Christmas on Earth features several painted and masked performers engaging in a variety of gay and straight sexual acts. The film's two separate black-and-white reels are projected simultaneously, one inside the other, with color filters placed on the projector lens, and, originally, an ad hoc soundtrack of contemporary rock radio. Performers included, among others, the underground star Gerard Malanga. The 29-minute film was inspired by Jack Smith's Flaming Creatures, over which Rubin clashed with censors alongside Mekas and P. Adams Sitney. Rubin's use of superimposition, and her decision to slice the original footage into "dynamic fragments," may have been influenced by the films of Jerry Jofen and Gregory Markopoulos. Rubin described her editing process as follows:

so I spent 3 months chopping the hours of film up into a basket and then toss and toss, flip and toss and one by one Absently enchantedly Destined to splice it together and separate on to two different reels and then project one reel half the size inside the other reel full screen size.

Rubin, only 18 when she began filming in 1963, shot the film using a borrowed 16mm Bolex camera, in New York City, in the Ludlow Street apartment of John Cale and Tony Conrad.

The title derives from Arthur Rimbaud's "Morning" from the extended poem A Season in Hell:

When will we go, over mountains and shores, to hail the birth of new labor, new wisdom, the flight of tyrants and demons, the end of superstition, – to be the first to adore! – Christmas on earth!

The film has been described by critics as "among the most radical ever made"; "far and away the most sexually explicit film produced by the pre-porn underground"; and "an essential document of queer and feminist cinema."

Due to its explicit nature, the New York City police tried to suppress the film; for a time during the mid-1960s Rubin habitually carried her one copy around with her for safekeeping. Allen Ginsberg was so impressed by Christmas on Earth he initiated an affair with Rubin after seeing it for the first time. Jonas Mekas praised it in Film Culture: "The first shock changes into silence then is transposed into amazement. We have seldom seen such down-to-body beauty, so real as only beauty (man) can be: terrible beauty that man, that woman is..." Others have dismissed the film as amateurish, and filmmaker Ken Jacobs called it "dreck."

After only a few screenings in the sixties, Rubin asked Mekas to destroy the film; instead, he shelved it. Years later she had another change of heart and gave him permission to screen it. "Since 1983, it has been screened regularly," wrote Johan Kugelberg, "and is slowly but steadily taking its place in the canon of 1960s underground films and cultural milestones that unraveled American censorship law and opened the field for artistic studies of sexual narratives."

Collaboration with Andy Warhol
Rubin, according to Andy Warhol, "was one of the first people to get multimedia interest going around New York." Although young, she had been working with Mekas for some time when she met Warhol, and brought ideas and experience to their collaboration. Christopher Mele wrote, "Experimental filmmakers Barbara Rubin and Andy Warhol utilized technologies such as multiple screens, slides, and projectors, and integrated other media, such as sculpture, music, and lighting to create a total experience that varied each night."

In 1965 Rubin was the subject of one of Warhol's Screen Tests (filmed by Gerard Malanga). That same year she appeared in Piero Heliczer's underground film, Dirt, with Warhol, Edie Sedgwick, and others. She also appeared in Heliczer's Venus in Furs, along with the Velvet Underground, and was included in a CBS news segment about the film titled "The Making of an Underground Film." More famously, it was Rubin who first introduced the Velvet Underground to Warhol, through Malanga, in December 1965.

A few weeks later, Rubin took part in a headline-making Warhol performance at a psychiatrists' convention:

On January 13, 1966, Warhol was invited to be the evening's entertainment at the NY Society for Clinical Psychiatry's forty-third annual dinner, held at Delmonico's Hotel. Bursting into the room with a camera, as the Velvet Underground acoustically tortured the guests and Gerard Malanga and Edie Sedgwick performed the "whip dance" in the background, Rubin taunted the attending psychiatrists. Casting blinding lights in their faces, Rubin hurled derogatory questions at the esteemed members of the medical profession, including: "What does her vagina feel like? Is his penis big enough? Do you eat her out?" As the horrified guests began to leave, Rubin continued her interrogation: "Why are you getting embarrassed? You're a psychiatrist; you're not supposed to get embarrassed." The following day the NY Times reported on the event; their chosen headline, "Shock treatment for psychiatrists," reveals the extent to which Rubin's guerrilla tactics had inverted the sanctioned relationship between patient and doctor, expert and amateur.
—Ara Osterweil

Later that year Rubin, dressed as a nun, projected Christmas on Earth onto the performing Velvet Underground as part of Andy Warhol Up-Tight and the Exploding Plastic Inevitable multimedia performances, accompanying the EPI on the road.

Other work
More than just a filmmaker, Rubin was known for her dynamic personality and her knack for artistic matchmaking. It was Rubin who organized the International Poetry Incarnation at the Albert Hall in London in 1965 and in 1967 persuaded Allen Ginsberg to buy the East Hill Farm as a haven for poets. She helped nurse her friend Bob Dylan back to health after his motorcycle accident in 1966, and appears on the back cover of his album Bringing It All Back Home. She organized a two-week multimedia festival, "Caterpillar Changes," at the Filmmakers Cinematheque in 1967, in which films by Harry Smith, Shirley Clarke, Storm de Hirsch and others were projected onto torn sheets and through hanging streamers. "Barbara was the moving force and coordinator between us all," Lou Reed said in a 2012 interview.  Ed Sanders, in his review of Gordon Ball's memoir, 66 Frames, called her "the legendary Barbara Rubin, who wandered the era pollinating across the film, poetry, folk-rock, and peacemaking scenes."

Final years
By the early 1970s, Rubin was twice married. The first marriage, to Mordechai Levy, was an arranged one and ended in divorce. The second was to Isaac Besancon, a French painter and follower of the mystical teachings of Rabbi Nachman of Bratslav. Rubin and Besancon first lived in Crown Heights, Brooklyn, in a small community of newly-observant artists that included filmmaker and collagist Jerry Jofen and his wife, Ellen Gordon. Rubin later moved with her husband to a religious community in the South of France in 1973. She died of a postnatal infection in France in 1980 after giving birth to her fifth child. She was 35.

Filmography
Directed:
Christmas on Earth (1963)
Emunah (1972)

Appears in:
Chumlum (Ron Rice, 1963)
Dirt (Piero Heliczer, 1965)
Venus in Furs (Piero Heliczer, 1965)
Screen Test (Andy Warhol, 1965)
Walden (Jonas Mekas, 1969)
Birth of a Nation (Jonas Mekas, 1997)
To Barbara Rubin with Love (Jonas Mekas, 2007)
Scenes from the Life of Andy Warhol 1963-1990 (Jonas Mekas, 1982)Barbara Rubin and the Exploding NY Underground'', a biographical documentary about Rubin directed by Chuck Smith, was released in 2018.

Notes

References

External links
 
 Clip from Christmas on Earth
 Poster for "Caterpillar Changes" festival
 To Barbara Rubin With Love, a video by Jonas Mekas
 "Christmas on Earth: Barbara Rubin", an exhibit curated by Johan Kugelberg and Jonas Mekas, December 18 – January 15, 2013
 "Queer Coupling, or The Stain of the Bearded Woman" by Ara Osterweil
 "Absently Enchanted: The Apocryphal, Ecstatic Cinema of Barbara Rubin" by Ara Osterweil
 "Embodying the Spectator – Barbara Rubin's 'Christmas on Earth' and the Pornographic Avant-Garde" by Charles Tuck
 , a write-up and review of the film "Barbara Rubin & the Exploding NY Underground" by Chuck Smith

1945 births
1980 deaths
American experimental filmmakers
Infectious disease deaths in France
People from Cambria Heights, Queens
Performance art in New York City
Date of birth missing
Date of death missing